Olkhovaya is a Moscow Metro station on the Sokolnicheskaya line. It was opened on 20 June 2019, as part of an extension that included Kommunarka, Prokshino, and Filatov Lug.

Design 

Overall, the station features a tree-inspired theme.

With white square tiles placed in "square diamond" positions, the walls of Olkhovaya station somewhat resemble Profsoyznaya metro station. However, the bottom edges are slightly pocking from the walls: this pattern resembles tree cones.

The station's hall (not on photo) has amber-like mosaic featuring trees in autumn (with yellow/orange leaves).

The lights have a similar source of tree-relates inspiration, resembling "winged" seeds of trees.

The very name of the station comes from "Olkha", Russian word for alder.

Overground 
The overground part of the station features a small park (paved roads and designer benches) and a large parking lot.

Role for "New Moscow" areas 

Said station is adjacent to Kaluzhskoe shosse highway and has a parking lot for "car-to-metro interchange". Thanks to various bus stops (various routes available) highway bus riders can interchange to Moscow Metro without dealing with MKAD-related rush hour traffic jams.
 Unlike many other out-of-Moscow highways, Kaluzhskoe Shosse highway does not have a railroad "double" to offer an undisturbed public transport alternative to the highway disturbed by severely congested MKAD; nowadays, Line 1 serves as the alternative, the "double" to avoid the constant traffic jam.

References 

Sokolnicheskaya Line
Moscow Metro stations
Railway stations in Russia opened in 2019